Henry Thynne (8 February 1675 – 20 December 1708) was an English Tory politician who sat in the English and British House of Commons from 1701 to 1708.

Early life
Thynne was the eldest of the three sons of Thomas Thynne, 1st Viscount Weymouth (1640–1714), of Longleat, a substantial landowner in Wiltshire and Gloucestershire, by his marriage to Lady Frances Finch, a daughter of Heneage Finch, 3rd Earl of Winchilsea. He was christened on 16 February 1675 at Drayton Bassett. He was educated at home and was very interested in literature. In 1692 he visited the Netherlands, Germany and Italy. As a young man, he taught French and Italian to his contemporary Elizabeth Singer (1674–1737), in whom Bishop Thomas Ken, then living at Longleat, had taken an interest when she was twelve. He married Grace Strode, the daughter and heiress of Sir George Strode and Grace FitzJames, who brought him a fortune of £20,000 on 29 April 1695. In To the Painter of an Ill-Drawn Picture of Cleone, the Honorable Mrs Thynne, a poem by Anne Finch, Countess of Winchilsea, Thynne appears under the name of "Theanor", while "Cleone" was his wife Grace, to whom Lady Winchilsea addressed several of her poems.

Career
At the 1695 English general election Thynne was put up as a candidate for parliament at Weobley but in an unpredictable borough was unsuccessful. He did not stand again until the first general election of 1701 when stood for Weobley again and as a backup at Weymouth and Melcombe Regis. He was rejected at Weobley again but was returned in a contest as Member of Parliament for Weymouth. He was not an active Member and was blacklisted for opposing the preparations for war with France. At the second general election of 1701, he stood at both Milborne Port and Tamworth and opted to sit for Tamworth. At Tamworth, he was returned unopposed with Thomas Guy (1644–1724), the speculator and founder of Guy's Hospital. Guy was a Whig, while Thynne was a Tory. Thynne supported the motion on 26 February 1702 which vindicated the Commons' proceedings in the impeaching the Whig lords. He was returned again as MP for Weymouth and Melcombe Regis at the 1702 English general election. He voted against agreeing with the Lords' amendments to the bill increasing the time for taking the oath of abjuration on 13 February 1703, but in April 1703, he fell ill, and was described by his father as 'overrun with the spleen'. He voted for the Tack on 28 November 1704. At the 1705 English general election, he was returned again as Tory MP for Weymouth and voted against the Court candidate for Speaker on 25 October 1705. He became less active in Parliament. At the 1708 British general election he was returned for two constituencies, Weymouth and Weobley, and chose to sit for Weymouth, before his sudden death.

Later life and legacy
Thynne became extremely obese. After he had died suddenly on 20 December 1708, the findings of a post mortem were reported in a letter to Edward Harley from his sister: 

On 3 January 1709 he was buried at Longbridge Deverill. He had two daughters, Frances Thynne, who married Algernon Seymour, 7th Duke of Somerset, and Mary Thynne (ca. 1702–1720), who married William Greville, 7th Baron Brooke (1695–1727). His grandchildren included Elizabeth Percy, Duchess of Northumberland.

Notes

1675 births
1708 deaths
17th-century English nobility
18th-century English nobility
British MPs 1707–1708
British MPs 1708–1710
Heirs apparent who never acceded
English MPs 1701
Members of the Parliament of Great Britain for English constituencies
Tory MPs (pre-1834)
English MPs 1701–1702
English MPs 1702–1705
English MPs 1705–1707
Henry